Sherman Page (May 9, 1779 – September 27, 1853) was an American lawyer, jurist, and politician who served two terms as a U.S. Representative from New York from 1833 to 1837.

Biography 
Born in Cheshire, Connecticut, Page attended the common schools.
He taught school in Coventry, New York, in 1799.
He studied law.
He was admitted to the bar in 1805 and commenced practice in Unadilla, New York.

He served as member of the State assembly in 1827.
He served as judge of the court of common pleas in Otsego County.

Congress 
Page was elected as a Jacksonian to the Twenty-third and Twenty-fourth Congresses (March 4, 1833 – March 3, 1837).

He served as chairman of the Committee on Public Expenditures (Twenty-fourth Congress).

Death 
He died in Unadilla, New York, September 27, 1853.
He was interred in St. Matthew's Cemetery.

Sources

1779 births
1853 deaths
Jacksonian members of the United States House of Representatives from New York (state)
19th-century American politicians
People from Cheshire, Connecticut
People from Coventry, New York
People from Unadilla, New York
Members of the United States House of Representatives from New York (state)